I Love You is a lost 1918 silent film drama directed by Walter Edwards and starring Alma Rubens. The film was produced and distributed by Triangle Film Corporation.

Cast
Alma Rubens – Felice
John Lince – Ravello
Francis McDonald – Jules Mardon
Wheeler Oakman – Armand de Gautier
Frederick Vroom – Prince del Chinay
Lillian Langdon – Princess del Chinay
Peaches Jackson – Boy

References

External links
 I Love You at IMDb.com

1918 films
American silent feature films
Triangle Film Corporation films
Lost American films
Films directed by Walter Edwards
American black-and-white films
American drama films
1918 drama films
1918 lost films
Lost drama films
1910s American films
Silent American drama films